John Wareham (10 April 1901 – 26 August 1984) was an English footballer who played on the left wing.

Career
Wareham played for non-league sides Scot Hay, Alsagers Bank P.S.A., and Podmore Hall, before joining Stoke in 1923. He did not play a first team game for the "Potters", and instead moved on to local rivals Port Vale in August 1924. After making his debut in a 4–1 defeat to Blackpool at Bloomfield Road on 22 April 1925, he played in the 4–0 defeat to Manchester United at Old Trafford three days later. These were his only Second Division appearances for the "Valiants", and he was released at the end of the season, at which point he signed with Crewe Alexandra of the Third Division North. He later played non-league football for Winsford United and Stafford Rangers.

Career statistics
Source:

References

1901 births
1984 deaths
Sportspeople from Newcastle-under-Lyme
English footballers
Association football wingers
Stoke City F.C. players
Port Vale F.C. players
Crewe Alexandra F.C. players
Winsford United F.C. players
Stafford Rangers F.C. players
English Football League players